Woolhouse is a surname. Notable people with the surname include:

 Daniel Woolhouse, professional Drifting driver from New Zealand
 Harold Woolhouse (1932–1996), British botanist
 Mark Woolhouse (born 1959), Professor of Epidemiology, University of Edinburgh
 Wesley S. B. Woolhouse (1809–1893), English actuary
 William Woolhouse (1791–1837), English cricketer